One Magnificent Morning (OMM) is an American programming block that is programmed by Hearst Media Production Group (formerly Litton Entertainment) and distributed by CBS Media Ventures, and debuted on October 4, 2014, as a replacement for the animation block Vortexx. It airs on Saturday mornings on the owned-and-operated stations and affiliates of The CW, the block features live-action documentary and lifestyle series aimed at teenagers between the ages of 13 and 18, the same style of programming that Litton provides for competing blocks seen on ABC, CBS, and NBC. All of the programs in the three-hour block are designed to meet federally mandated educational programming guidelines.

History
Between May 31, 2014 and June 5, 2014, The CW announced that it would discontinue its existing Saturday morning block Vortexx, which was produced by Saban Brands, in favour of One Magnificent Morning, a new, five-hour block produced by Litton Entertainment and distributed by CBS Television Distribution, that would feature live-action educational programming aimed teenagers and their parents. The move came as part of a growing shift by broadcast television networks towards non-fiction programming to fulfil the FCC-mandated requirement to air a quota of educational programming weekly. The previous year, Litton began producing CBS Dream Team, a similar E/I block for sister network CBS (corporate parent CBS Corporation is a part-owner of The CW), and the company has also produced Litton's Weekend Adventure for ABC's affiliates since September 3, 2011.

Vortexx aired for the final time on September 27, 2014. It was thought to be the last conclusive Saturday morning block across the major U.S. commercial broadcast networks that primarily featured non-educational children's programming. Such content has gradually fallen out of favour because of the E/I rules, as well as shifts in viewing habits towards cable networks and online video on demand services for cartoons and other youth-oriented content. One Magnificent Morning debuted the following week on October 4, 2014, following the cancellation of Vortexx in its 7:00 a.m. to Noon timeslot. As a consequence of the block launching three weeks after the traditional start of the syndication television season, Litton provided a temporary barter package of Everyday Health and Culture Click (which both formerly aired on Litton's Weekend Adventure) to CW stations, allowing those who depended on the OMM block to fulfill E/I guidelines to have programming before it started. Some initially announced shows that were not produced for the block were: America's Flavors, Social Media Mania, Swag, and Taste of Home.

On January 7, 2016, The CW and Litton announced a five-year renewal for the block, extending it through the 2020–21 broadcast season. On October 7, 2017, the block was reduced to the federally mandated minimum running time of three hours and began airing from 8:00 a.m. to 11:00 a.m. local time. The CW gave its two hours of reclaimed time to its affiliate stations.

On July 1, 2021, The CW and Litton announced that they have extended their partnership for the block.

Programming
Although One Magnificent Morning provides the three-hour minimum requirement of E/I programming each week, which exceeds defined under the Federal Communications Commission (FCC)'s Children's Television Act, some of The CW's owned-and-operated stations and affiliates continue to provide E/I-compliant programs acquired from the syndication market, mainly due to existing program distribution contracts. The CW Plus, in particular, continues to supply two hours of E/I-compliant syndicated programs within its national schedule following the block on Saturday afternoons, which further alleviates the service's subscription-subchannel affiliates from the responsibility of purchasing the local rights to such programs (the service's carriage of seven hours of E/I-compliant programming, and the fact that most of its affiliates operate as subchannels, allow The CW Plus's broadcast outlets to carry an additional subchannel without E/I interruptions under the Children's Television Act's programming regulations, as the local CW Plus outlet would have enough E/I content to cover both).

Some stations also added additional E/I programming to their schedules during the run of Save to Win, a game show co-produced by Litton and the American retail chain Family Dollar which was criticized as hidden paid programming advertising the chain. Several stations refused to list Save to Win within their quarterly E/I reports, unsure of its true educational value and wanting to avoid FCC scrutiny over the matter due to past fines involving product placement within a product's own television program which violated the Children's Television Act of 1990.

Current programming

Former programming

References

External links

The CW
Litton Entertainment
CBS Media Ventures
Brokered programming
Television programming blocks in the United States
2014 American television series debuts
Television shows featuring audio description